Saint-Paul-en-Forêt (literally Saint-Paul in Forest; Provençal: Sant Pau de la Galina) is a commune in the Var department in the Provence-Alpes-Côte d'Azur region in southeastern France.

Government
The mayor of Saint-Paul-en-Forêt has been André Bagur since 1971.

Personalities
Gilbert Becaud

See also
Communes of the Var department

References

External links 
 
 Official Website

Communes of Var (department)